Deonte Harty (born Deonte Harris, December 4, 1997) is an American football wide receiver and return specialist for the Buffalo Bills of the National Football League (NFL). He played college football at Assumption University in Worcester, Massachusetts, and signed with the New Orleans Saints as an undrafted free agent in 2019. Harty grew up in the Baltimore suburb of Middle River, Maryland and played high school football at Archbishop Curley High School where he also lettered in basketball and track & field.

High school career
As a senior at Baltimore's Archbishop Curley High School, Harty was named the 2014 Varsity Sports Network Offensive Player of the Year for football.  He earned All-Conference and All-State honors, and was selected to The Baltimore Suns First-team All-Metro for the 2014 football season. That same year, Harty led the Friars to the Maryland Interscholastic Athletic Association (MIAA) B Conference Championship and their first undefeated football season in school history, which included a 28–0 shutout victory over traditional MIAA "A" Conference powerhouse Loyola Blakefield, a game in which Harty amassed 206 total yards (140 rushing, 66 receiving) with 2 touchdowns. He recorded 2,030 yards of total offense for that season with 25 touchdowns in 10 games.  He ran for 1,450 yards for the season on 130 carries with 20 rushing touchdowns. In the 2014 MIAA Championship game, Harty had 211 total yards, scoring 5 touchdowns in a 56–14 victory over St. Paul's School to win the conference title.

As a junior (2013) Harty and rushed for 933 yards on 86 carries for the Friars and scored a total of 18 touchdowns (14 rushing and four receiving). His sophomore season (2012), he went for 676 yards on 63 carries with six touchdowns.

College career

Harty played football at Assumption College, a Division II school.Assumption College Career Highlights: Holds the NCAA record (regardless of division) as college football's all-time leader for combined touchdown returns – 14
 Holds the NCAA D-II Record for single-season combined touchdown returns – 8 
 Tied NCAA Division-II Record for single-game kickoff return touchdowns – 2
 Tied NCAA Division-II Record for single-season punt return touchdowns – 5
 2017 Northeast-10 Conference MVP
 2015 Northeast-10 Conference Rookie of the Year
 2018 Second-team All-American by the American Football Coaches Association
 2018 Northeast-10 Conference First-team All-Conference as WR & KR
 2017 First-team All-American by the American Football Coaches Association
 2017 First-team All-American by Conference Commissioner's Association
 2017 Second-team All-American by D2football.com
 2017 Northeast-10 Conference First-team All-Conference as WR & KR
 2015 Don Hansen Football Gazette Second-team All-AmericanSchool Records:'''
 Career Touchdowns (45)
 All-purpose yards in school history- 6,173
 Combined touchdown returns in school history – 14
 Combined touchdown returns in a single season in school history – 8 (2017)
 Punt return touchdowns in a single season – 5 (2017)
 Punts returned for touchdowns in a single game – 2 (twice)
 Kickoffs returned for touchdowns in a single game – 2
 Punts returned for touchdowns in school history – 8
 Kickoffs returned for touchdowns in school history – 6

Professional career

New Orleans Saints

2019 season
Harty signed with the New Orleans Saints as a rookie undrafted free agent in 2019. After an impressive training camp featuring a 78-yard touchdown return against the New York Jets in the pre-season, Harty made the final cut and was named to the Saints 53-man roster.

Harty made his NFL debut on Monday Night Football'' as the Saints primary kick returner in the season-opener against the Houston Texans. During a Week 3 33–27 road victory against the Seattle Seahawks, he scored his first NFL touchdown on a 53-yard punt return, the NFL's first punt return touchdown of the 2019 season.

Harty finished his rookie year as the leader in punt returns, combined returns, and punt return yards and was selected to the Pro Bowl. He is the first undrafted Saint to make the Pro Bowl roster as a rookie. He was also just one of four players in the league to have a punt return touchdown in 2019.

2020 season
Harty was placed on the reserve/COVID-19 list by the Saints on August 14, 2020, and was activated two days later. He scored his first professional receiving touchdown in Week 7 against the Carolina Panthers. On December 19, 2020, Harty was placed on injured reserve. He was activated on January 9, 2021.

2021 season
On November 26, 2021, Harty was suspended three games after a DUI arrest in July.

2022 season
On March 14, 2022, the Saints placed a second-round restricted free agent tender on Harty. He was placed on injured reserve on October 15, 2022.

Buffalo Bills
On March 16, 2023, Harty signed a two-year contract with the Buffalo Bills.

NFL statistics

Legal issues
On July 16, 2021, Harty was arrested in Towson, Maryland on suspicion of driving under the influence of alcohol. He was cited for negligent driving, reckless driving, failure to obey traffic control device instructions, and exceeding the speed limit after driving erratically and going 77 mph in a 55 mph zone.

In December 2021, Deonte Harris legally changed his name to Deonte Harty to honor his stepfather.

References

External links

New Orleans Saints bio
Assumption Greyhounds bio

1997 births
Living people
Players of American football from Baltimore
American football wide receivers
American football return specialists
Assumption Greyhounds football players
Buffalo Bills players
New Orleans Saints players
National Conference Pro Bowl players